The Beaver Pond Formation is a formation cropping out in Newfoundland, Canada.

References

Geology of Newfoundland and Labrador